Humberto Solás (4 December 1941 – 18 September 2008) was a Cuban film director, credited with directing the film Lucía (1968), which explored the lives of Cuban women during different periods in Cuban history.
 
His cinematic style borrows from Luchino Visconti's mise en scene and is permeated by sometimes heavy melodrama. He started making shorts at a very young age and directed his first medium length film Manuela in 1967. The success of this film led him to direct Lucía, told in three stories in different moments of Cuban history, all seen through the eyes of a different woman named Lucia.

Solás won 13 awards for filmmaking and been nominated for an additional nine. His 1968 film Lucía won the Golden Prize and the Prix FIPRESCI at the 6th Moscow International Film Festival. His 1985 film A Successful Man was entered into the 15th Moscow International Film Festival.

In 1977 he was a member of the jury at the 10th Moscow International Film Festival. He twice served on the jury at the Berlin International Film Festival, in 1977 and 1997. In 2003, he founded Gibara's Poor Cinema Festival, "open to filmmakers with limited funds". Solás was awarded Cuba's National Film Prize in 2005.

Humberto Solás died of cancer on September 18, 2008, at the age of 66.

Filmography
Solás directed twenty-four films, from La Huida in 1959 to Barrio Cuba and Adela in 2005, wrote twelve and produced one. The following is an incomplete filmography:
1958: La Huida
1963: El refrato (short)
1964: El Acoso (short)
1967: Manuela
1968: Lucía
1972: Un dia de noviembre
1975: Cantata de Chile
1981: Cecilia
1986: Un hombre de exito
1991: El siglo de las Luces
2001: Miel para Oshun
2005: Barrio Cuba
2005: Adela

References

External links

 The Independent: Humberto Solas: Director who told the stories of Cuba's struggles under Castro

1941 births
2008 deaths
Cuban film directors
Deaths from cancer in Cuba